Gemini: Good vs. Evil is Krayzie Bone's fourth CD release (the third if one does not count Leatha Face: The Legends Underground (Part 1), (which was an underground release). It was released on February 8, 2005. He signed a one-album deal with then newly established Ball'r Records (now defunct). It was his first album in almost four years. The first week's sales were not as impressive as his previous albums, selling 21,253  first week, but the album had very little promotion. It felt back to the 167th position with 8,042 copies of the next week, followed by a near-to-dropout 196th spot with a low sales of 6,422 totaling 35,717 copies on the chart.

Track listing

Chart positions

References 

2005 albums
Krayzie Bone albums
Albums produced by Lil Jon
Horrorcore albums
Albums produced by L.T. Hutton
Albums produced by Fredwreck
Gangsta rap albums by American artists